We Don’t Know Ourselves (2021) is a personal history of modern Ireland by Irish journalist and writer Fintan O’Toole from 1958 to the present day.

Synopsis
Across forty three chapters, O’Toole takes an episodic journey through a series of historical eras, covering everything from 1950s Ireland’s predilection for emigration to Britain and the U.S. and the suffocating grip held by the Catholic church on daily life, through to the Northern Ireland Peace Process, the Celtic Tiger and the recent liberal renaissance in such matters as abortion and same sex marriage. Throughout he uses details and incidents from his own life, comparing them to contemporary media and official reports.

Reception 
The book was a #1 Irish Times bestseller.

It received positive reviews in the Irish Times, The Guardian, The Atlantic, New York Times, Times Literary Supplement, and the Financial Times.

The Times Literary Supplement describes the book as “masterly, fascinating and frequently horrifying”.

It was selected for The New York Timess "10 Best Books of 2022" list.

Awards
The book won the 2021 Book of the Year award at the Irish Book Awards.

References

2021 non-fiction books
21st-century history books
History books about Ireland
Head of Zeus books